Arab al-Aramshe, officially Aramsha, is a Bedouin village in the Western Galilee in Israel. Located south of the Lebanese border, not far from the Mediterranean coast, the village falls under the jurisdiction of Mateh Asher Regional Council.

History
Aramshe was founded as a permanent settlement for Bedouins living in the area. The predominant surnames among the population are: Majis, Maz'el, Suidan, and 'Ali. 

Over the years, Aramshe residents have experienced attacks. During the 2006 Lebanon War, Fadiya Juma'a (age 60) and her daughters Samira (33) and Sultana (31) were killed by a bomb that fell in the garden of their home in August.

See also
Arab localities in Israel
Bedouin in Israel

References

Arab al-Aramshe
Populated places in Northern District (Israel)